Color science is the scientific study of color including lighting and optics; measurement of light and color; the physiology, psychophysics, and modeling of color vision; and color reproduction.

Organizations 

 International Commission on Illumination (CIE)
 Illuminating Engineering Society (IES)
 Inter-Society Color Council (ISCC)
 Society for Imaging Science and Technology (IS&T)
 International Colour Association (AIC)
 Optica, formerly the Optical Society of America (OSA)
 The Colour Group
 Society of Dyers and Colourists (SDC)
 American Association of Textile Chemists and Colorists (AATCC)
 Association for Research in Vision and Ophthalmology (ARVO)
 ACM SIGGRAPH
 Vision Sciences Society (VSS)
 Council for Optical Radiation Measurements (CORM)

Journals 

The preeminent scholarly journal publishing research papers in color science is Color Research and Application, started in 1975 by founding editor-in-chief Fred Billmeyer, along with Gunter Wyszecki, Michael Pointer and Rolf Kuehni, as a successor to the Journal of Colour (1964–1974). Previously most color science work had been split between journals with broader or partially overlapping focus such as the Journal of the Optical Society of America (JOSA), Photographic Science and Engineering (1957–1984), and the Journal of the Society of Dyers and Colourists (renamed Coloration Technology in 2001).

Other journals where color science papers are published include the Journal of Imaging Science & Technology, the Journal of Perceptual Imaging, the Journal of the International Colour Association (JAIC), the Journal of the Color Science Association of Japan, Applied Optics, and the Journal of Vision.

Conferences 

 Congress of the International Color Association
 IS&T Color and Imaging Conference (CIC)
 SIGGRAPH
 International Symposium for Color Science and Art

Selected books 
  3rd ed. (2000).
 
 
  Author's website. 2nd ed. (2005).
 
  1st ed. (1997).
 
 
 
 
 
 

 
Color
Image processing
Measurement
Psychophysics
Visual perception